Her Choice is a 1915 American silent comedy film featuring Oliver Hardy.

Cast
 Mae Hotely as Mrs. Stern
 Ed Lawrence as Mr. Stern
 Raymond McKee as Harry
 Jerold T. Hevener as Count Lamont
 Ben Walker as Lord Chase
 Oliver Hardy (as Babe Hardy)

See also
 List of American films of 1915
 Filmography of Oliver Hardy

External links

1915 films
1915 comedy films
Silent American comedy films
American black-and-white films
1915 short films
American silent short films
American comedy short films
1910s American films